Montelibretti is a town and  (municipality) in the Metropolitan City of Rome in the Italian region of Lazio, located about  northeast of Rome on the slopes of Monti Sabini.

Montelibretti borders the following municipalities: Capena, Fara in Sabina, Fiano Romano, Monterotondo, Montopoli di Sabina, Montorio Romano, Moricone, Nerola, Palombara Sabina. The hamlet Borgo Santa Maria is a part of the town administratively.

History
The name derives from the presence of a Roman villa owned by Caius Brutius Presentis, Commodus' father-in-law. In the Middle Ages, starting from the 15th century, it was a fortress of the Orsini, who were succeeded by the Barberini  and then by the Sciarra.

In 1867 it was the location of a battle between Garibaldine  and Papal troops, in the course of the Battle of Mentana.

Main sights
Parish church of St. Nicholas
Barberini Palace, built over a castle of the Orsini
Necropolis of Colle del Forno (7th century BC), attributed to the Sabini town of Eretum

References

Cities and towns in Lazio
Castles in Italy